Saint-Benoît-sur-Loire (literally Saint-Benoît on Loire) is a commune in the Loiret department in north-central France.

Monastery

This town hosts the Abbaye de Fleury, also known as the Abbaye de Saint Benoît (Saint Benedict Abbey). Founded around 630, it is one of the oldest abbeys of the Benedictine rule. In 660, the remains of Saint Benedict of Nursia were transferred to Saint Benoît from Monte Cassino by Mommolin of Fleury.

The monastery, known for the Fleury Playbook, was pillaged and damaged multiple times over the course of history, including during the Norman conquests and the French Revolution. The current abbey church is in the Romanesque style and dates from the eleventh century. A community of approximately 40 monks currently resides in the monastery.

See also
 Communes of the Loiret department
 Saint-Benoît-du-Sault

References

External links

 Town council website (in French)

Saintbenoitsurloire
Carnutes